Martin Männel (born 16 March 1988) is a German professional footballer, who plays for and captains  club Erzgebirge Aue as a goalkeeper. Since his arrival in 2008, Männel has been spending his career with the Veilchen side. 

On 24 May 2015, he gained notoriety after scoring a goal against 1. FC Heidenheim that tied the match on the final score of 2–2.

Club career
Männel began his football career at the age of eight at FSV Velten and, later on, SC Oberhavel Velten. At the age of 14, he moved to Energie Cottbus, where he attended the so-called "Elite School of Football", the Lausitzer Sports Academy. Männel progressed through all the youth departments and, in 2005, became the starting goalkeeper of Cottbus' reserve team when he was just 17 years old. 

For the 2008–09 season, he signed a two-year contract with Erzgebirge Aue, being involved in the same operation that also brought his fellow teammates Arne Feick, Jan Hochscheidt and Marc Hensel to Saxony. Thanks to some impressive performances, he quickly replaced Stephan Flauder as the club's main goalkeeper, and he achieved his biggest sporting success early on by winning the promotion to the 2. Bundesliga with Erzgebirge at the end of the 2009–10 season. During the same year, Männel signed a contract extension with the club until 2012. The first appearance in the second tier for both the goalkeeper and Erzgebirge turned out to beat pretty successful: in fact, while at the winter break the newly promoted team surprisingly topped the league table, at the end of the season they finished in fifth place. 

At the beginning of the 2013–14 season, Männel initially lost his starting place in goal to newly arrived Sascha Kirschstein, but managed to regain it during the second half of the league. In February 2014, he extended his contract with Aue until June 2016.

On 24 May 2015, while his side was involved in a relegation battle, Männel scored a header from a corner kick in the 88th minute of a match against 1. FC Heidenheim, thus establishing the final score of 2–2. Despite their efforts, the club still suffered relegation to the 3. Liga: however, after only one year down, the club returned to the 2. Bundesliga in 2016.

During the 2019–20 and 2020–21 seasons, Männel gained some fame as a frequent "penalty blocker": in fact, he saved 7 out of the 12 penalties he has faced combinely. These statistics include a last-minute save of Michael Frey's attempt to secure Erzerbirge a 4–3 win against Nürnberg, on 18 October 2019, and the two saves he performed (Denis Thomalla and Christian Kühlwetter being the respective penalty takers) in a 2–0 loss against Heidenheim, on 13 February 2021.

International career
Männel was a youth international for Germany. During his time at Energie Cottbus, he was called-up to the under-19 national team for the first time. On 21 July 2007, he suffered a hearing trauma while he was playing in a game against Serbia U19, as an explosive device blasted right next to his goal.

Personal life
Martin Männel is married to the television reporter Doreen Männel, who has worked as an editor at MDR Fernsehen. They have two sons, born in 2012 and 2018.

Career statistics

References

External links

1986 births
Living people
German footballers
Germany youth international footballers
FC Energie Cottbus II players
FC Erzgebirge Aue players
2. Bundesliga players
3. Liga players
Association football goalkeepers
People from Hennigsdorf
Footballers from Brandenburg